The 2012 Summit League men's soccer tournament will be the seventh edition of the four-team tournament. The tournament will decide The Summit League champion and guaranteed representative into the 2012 NCAA Division I Men's Soccer Championship. The tournament will be held from November 7–10, 2012 with the higher seed hosting each match.

Qualification

Bracket

Schedule

Semifinals

Championship

Statistical leaders

Goalscorers
A total of 11 goals were scored over 3 matches, for an average of 3.67 goals per match.

3 goals
 Nathan Bruinsma - Western Illinois
1 goal

 Kyle Ackerman - Fort Wayne
 Kyle Bethel - Oakland
 Tyler Chavez - Western Illinois
 Jeff Cheslik - Oakland
 Matt Dudley - Oakland
 Gavin Hoy - Oakland
 Miche'le Lipari - Oakland
 Joey Tinnion- Oakland

See also 
 The Summit League
 2012 The Summit League men's soccer season
 2012 NCAA Division I men's soccer season
 2012 NCAA Division I Men's Soccer Championship

References 

 The Summit League Men's Soccer Tournament Central

Summit League Men's Soccer Tournament
The Summit League Men's Soccer Tournament
Soccer in Illinois